Chinchilla railway station is located on the Western line in Queensland, Australia. It serves the town of Chinchilla. The station has one platform, opening in 1878. Until 1994, it had a locomotive depot.

Services
Chinchilla is served by Queensland Rail Travel's twice weekly Westlander service travelling between Brisbane and Charleville.

References

External links

Chinchilla station Queensland's Railways on the Internet

Darling Downs
Railway stations in Australia opened in 1878
Regional railway stations in Queensland
Chinchilla, Queensland
Western railway line, Queensland